Muhudu Maha Vihara (Sinhalaː මුහුදු මහා විහාරය) is a Buddhist temple at Pottuvil in  Ampara District, Eastern province of Sri Lanka. This temple, near a wide beach, was built over 2000 years ago by King Kavan Tissa of Ruhuna. The ruins and remains of ancient stupas, Seema Malaka, Avasa Geya and statues can be seen at the site. Important ruins at the temple premises include stone statues of Buddha and two statues of old kings or gods.

History
This viharaya marks the landing place of Viharamahadevi, daughter of Kelani Tissa, who was destined to become the queen of King Kavan Tissa of the Rohana kingdom. According to the ancient chronicle Rajavaliya, it is stated that in the second century BC after Kelaniya was submerged by the sea due to a natural disaster, Devi the daughter of King of Kelaniya was cast to sea in a Golden Vessel to appease the gods, and washed ashore near the Muhudu Maha Vihara in Pottuwil. Later she became the main consort of king Kavan Tissa of Ruhuna Kingdom, under the name Viharamahadevi.

See also
 Magul Maha Viharaya

Notes and references

External links
 Muhudu Maha Viharaya, Pottuvil

Buddhist temples in Ampara District
Archaeological protected monuments in Ampara District